Jack Ikegwuonu (born January 7, 1986) is a former American football cornerback. He was drafted by the Philadelphia Eagles in the fourth round of the 2008 NFL Draft. He played college football at Wisconsin.

Early years
Ikegwuonou was born in Jackson, Mississippi to medical professionals, Patty and Fidelis Ikegwuonu, and raised in Madison, Wisconsin. He attended and played football at James Madison Memorial High School. Ikegwuonu earned first-team all-state honors as a split end and defensive back, All-Midwest Region honors, and All-Area accolades. He was named the Big Eight Conference Wide Receiver of the Year, Big Eight Conference Defensive Back of the Year, and team MVP twice. In addition to football and basketball, Ikegwuonu played center field for his school's baseball team.

College career

2005 season
Ikegwuonu garnered a Freshman All-American honorable mention by The Sporting News. He shared left cornerback duties starting at that position against Illinois, Penn State and Auburn adding another starting assignment at nickel back against Hawaii. Wearing jersey #27, Jack Ikegwuonu recorded 23 solo out of 26 tackles with two stops for a total of 6 yards in losses. He was responsible for deflecting 3 passes and intercepted 3 others for 63 yards in returns and one touchdowns.

2006 season
Ikegwuonu was selected as an All-Big Ten Conference first-team choice by the league's coaches and media, adding second-team honors from the media. Although he was suspended briefly after his December arrest, he was allowed to play in the Citrus Bowl. He started all 13 games at right cornerback, switching to jersey #6 from #27 and recording 38 solo out of 41 tackles with 3.5 stops for a total of 14 yards in losses, caused a fumble and recovered another for a 50-yard touchdown return. He was responsible for deflecting 11 passes and intercepted two passes for 28 return yards.

2007 season
Ikegwuonu was selected as an All-Big Ten Conference first-team choice by the league's coaches and media. He started all 13 games at right cornerback, recording 19 solo out 24 tackles with a league-high fifteen pass deflections and one interception for a 2-yard loss. He saw his main pass coverage assignments catch 38 passes for an average of 15.76 yards and five touchdowns.

Ikegwuonu elected to forgo his senior college season to enter the 2008 NFL Draft, but he injured his knee in January 2008 while preparing for the NFL Scouting Combine.

College statistics

 
Source:

Professional career
Ikegwuonu was selected by the Philadelphia Eagles in the fourth round (131st overall) of the 2008 NFL Draft after being projected as high as a first-round draft pick. He missed the entire 2008 season because of a knee injury during the 2008 NFL Combine and on July 22 was placed on the Physically-Unable-to-Perform list.

He was waived on September 5, 2009. He was re-signed to the team's practice squad on September 7, 2009. After cornerback Joselio Hanson was suspended for four games for failing a drug test before the start of the 2008 NFC Championship game, Ikegwuonu was promoted to the active roster. He played in his first regular season game in the NFL on November 22, 2009 against the Chicago Bears. He was waived on November 24 after the team signed Geoffrey Pope off the Cincinnati Bengals practice squad.

Personal life
Ikegwuonu was charged with residential burglary and criminal trespass in DeKalb, Illinois on November 26, 2006. He was found not guilty on all charges.

In November 2014, Ikegwuonu and his twin brother were arrested in Madison, Wisconsin, for allegedly committing five armed robberies. Police said money from the robberies was primarily used to purchase heroin. In March 2015, Ikegwuonu and his brother pleaded guilty. Ikegwuonu  was sentenced to 9.5 years in prison.

References

External links
Draft bio

1986 births
Living people
Sportspeople from Madison, Wisconsin
Players of American football from Wisconsin
American football cornerbacks
Wisconsin Badgers football players
Philadelphia Eagles players